Masoud Sulaiman (Arabic:مسعود سليمان) (born 16 June 1992) is an Emirati footballer. He currently plays as a defender for Khor Fakkan.

Sulaiman made his first appearance for the United Arab Emirates national football team in a friendly 1-0 loss to Syria.

External links

References

Emirati footballers
United Arab Emirates international footballers
1992 births
Living people
Baniyas Club players
Al-Nasr SC (Dubai) players
Al Dhafra FC players
Khor Fakkan Sports Club players
UAE Pro League players
Association football defenders